The 2010–11 Action Cricket Twenty20 was the fourth season of the women's Twenty20 cricket competition played in New Zealand. It ran from December 2010 to February 2011, with 6 provincial teams taking part. Canterbury Magicians beat Wellington Blaze in the final to win the tournament, their second Twenty20 title.

The tournament ran alongside the 2010–11 Action Cricket Cup.

Competition format 
Teams played in a double round-robin in a group of six, playing 10 matches overall. Matches were played using a Twenty20 format. The top two in the group advanced to the final.

The group worked on a points system with positions being based on the total points. Points were awarded as follows:

Win: 4 points 
Tie: 2 points 
Loss: 0 points.
Abandoned/No Result: 2 points.

Points table

Source: ESPN Cricinfo

 Advanced to the Final

Final

Statistics

Most runs

Source: ESPN Cricinfo

Most wickets

Source: ESPN Cricinfo

References

External links
 Series home at ESPN Cricinfo

Super Smash (cricket)
2010–11 New Zealand cricket season
Action Cricket Twenty20